Eddie Edmonson (November 20, 1889 – May 10, 1971) was a Major League Baseball player who played for one season. Earl Edward Edmonson was born on November 20, 1889 in Hopewell, Pennsylvania. At the age of 23, Edmonson joined the Cleveland Naps during the 1913 Cleveland Naps season and played in his first Major League Baseball game on October 4 of that year. A little more than a month later, Edmonson played in his second and final game on October 5, 1913. Nicknamed "Axel", Edmonson played one game as a first baseman and the other game as an outfielder. During his two-game career, Edmonson made it to bat five times, but went 0 for 5 and ended up with a .000 hitting average, despite his ability to throw right and bat left. Edmonson died at the age of 81 in Leesburg, Florida on May 10, 1971. He is buried at Greenwood Cemetery in Orlando, Florida.

Notes

References

External links

1889 births
1971 deaths
Cleveland Naps players
Waterbury Contenders players
New Orleans Pelicans (baseball) players